Lyle Russel "Skitch" Henderson (January 27, 1918 – November 1, 2005) was a pianist, conductor, and composer. His nickname "Skitch" came from his ability to "re-sketch" a song in a different key. Bing Crosby suggested that he should use the name professionally.

Early years
As his career developed, Henderson often claimed to have been born in Birmingham, England, also adding "Cedric" to his name. However, he was born in the town of Halstad in northwest Minnesota in 1918 to Joseph and Josephine (Scheie) Henderson, both of Norwegian descent. After his mother died when he was two in 1920, he was raised in Halstad by his aunt Hattie Henderson Gift and uncle Frank Gift. His aunt taught him piano, starting at the age of four. Although he did not receive formal conservatory education in music, Henderson received classical training under Fritz Reiner, Albert Coates, Arnold Schoenberg, Ernst Toch and Arturo Toscanini, who invited him to conduct the NBC Symphony Orchestra. Henderson would later recount learning the ropes by playing in taverns with popular singers of the day.

Film
After starting his professional career in the 1930s playing piano in the roadhouses of the American Midwest, Henderson's major break came when he was an accompanist on a 1937 MGM promotional tour featuring Judy Garland and Mickey Rooney. Henderson later said that as a member of MGM's music department, he worked with Garland to learn "Over the Rainbow" during rehearsals for The Wizard of Oz and played piano for her first public performance of the song at a local nightclub before the film was finished. However this account is at odds with the memoirs of the tune's composer, Harold Arlen, who said he first performed the song for the 14-year-old Garland.

Radio
Blue Network Varieties, which began May 20, 1940, on NBC's Pacific Blue network, featured Henderson in charge of the music, leading "a novelty instrumental group."

After the war, Henderson worked for NBC Radio Network, where he was the musical director for Frank Sinatra's Light-Up Time. He was also accompanist on Philco Radio Time with Bing Crosby on the new ABC network. Henderson also played on Bob Hope's Pepsodent Show.

In 1946, Henderson and the Golden Gate Quartet headlined a 13-week summer replacement program on NBC, sponsored by Old Gold cigarettes.

In 1950, Henderson had a disc jockey program on WNBC in New York City.

Henderson also recorded transcriptions for the Capitol Transcriptions service.

Recordings 
In 1946, Henderson formed his own orchestra and signed a contract with Capitol Records. Among his earliest releases for Capitol was a 3-disc set titled Keyboard Sketches.  His recording career spanned the period from 78s to CDs. Two albums as pianist for Arbors Records were released in the early 21st century, Swinging With Strings (2001) and Legends, with Bucky Pizzarelli (2003). Henderson also served as conductor of The New York Pops with Maureen McGovern on With a Song in My Heart: The Great Songs of Richard Rodgers for Reader's Digest and Centaur Records.

Henderson conducted a 1963 recording for RCA Victor of George Gershwin's Porgy and Bess with Leontyne Price and William Warfield, which won a Grammy.

Television 

In a career at NBC from 1951 to 1966, Henderson was conductor of the orchestras for The Tonight Show and The Today Show.

Henderson served as the bandleader for both Tonight Starring Steve Allen, and The Tonight Show Starring Johnny Carson. Henderson left the show again in 1966, during Carson's early years as host, and was replaced by Milton Delugg, who was succeeded by trumpeter Doc Severinsen (who led the NBC Orchestra until Carson's retirement in 1992).

Conducting career 
In 1983, Henderson founded The New York Pops orchestra, which makes its home at Carnegie Hall in New York City. He served as the music director and conductor of the orchestra until his death in 2005. Henderson also conducted numerous symphonic orchestras throughout the world.

His radio work included:
 California Melodies debuted 1940, Mutual, KHJ
 Songs by Sinatra 1946
 I Deal in Crime 1946, ABC
 Philco Radio Time starring Bing Crosby 1946, ABC
 Best of All 1954, NBC
 United States Air Force Presents 1969
 Skitch Henderson with the Music Makers

Television programs 
 Match Game, 1962–1963
 Password, 5 episodes, 1967
 Faye Emerson's Wonderful Town, co-host, 1951-1952
 What's My Line?, Mystery Guest, 1973

Filmography 
 Act One (1963)
 Who Says I Can't Ride a Rainbow! (1971)

He also wrote Baby Made a Change in Me for the 1948 movie On Our Merry Way.

Awards and honors 
In 1997, Henderson was honored for the vital role he played in the cultural life of New York City by being awarded the Handel Medallion, presented by the City of New York, New York.

On January 29, 2005, Henderson was awarded the Smithsonian Institution's highest honor, the James Smithson Bicentennial Medal. An exhibit highlighting the musician's career and showcasing the medal, "Skitch Henderson: A Man and His Music," was on display at the Smithsonian from January 30, 2005, to March 13, 2005.

Henderson was the recipient of three honorary degrees – from St. Thomas Aquinas College, the University of South Florida, and Western Connecticut State University.

Miscellaneous 
The Retro Swing Band at the University of Wisconsin plays arrangements from The Tonight Show and the BBC Dance Band included in the Skitch Henderson Collection at the Mills Music Library.

Henderson was known for his unique laugh on the Carson show. In addition to Ed McMahon's famously hearty laugh, Henderson could also occasionally be heard laughing his distinctive "Hoo-hoo-hoo!"

Personal life 

Henderson married movie actress and television personality Faye Emerson in 1950. They were divorced seven years later. He then married Ruth Einsiedel in 1958 and raised two children, Hans and Heidi. Hans was married to Sandra Watson for 18 years, before divorcing in 2000. Heidi was married to actor William Hurt from 1989 to 1992, and they have two sons. Skitch and Ruth Henderson owned and operated The Silo, a store, art gallery, and cooking school in New Milford, Connecticut from 1972 until his death.

In 2003, Ruth and Skitch Henderson co-founded the Hunt Hill Farm Trust, an effort to preserve their farm's land and buildings and to celebrate Americana in music, art and literature through the creation of a living museum.

Henderson died of natural causes on November 1, 2005, at age 87.

Legal problems 
Henderson was indicted on July 2, 1974, on charges of tax evasion for the years 1969 and 1970, concerning claims about the value (allegedly $350,000) of a music library he donated to the University of Wisconsin–Madison. He further claimed he had consulted with Leonard Bernstein and Henry Mancini about the value of his collection, both of whom denied this in testimony at trial. A signature on an acceptance letter from the library director was also deemed a forgery. Henderson was convicted on two counts of filing false tax returns. He was acquitted on the tax evasion charges and obstructing a tax audit.

Henderson was sentenced on January 17, 1975, to six months in prison, and was fined $10,000. He began serving his sentence at a minimum-security Federal prison on April 9, 1975, and was released after four months, on August 4, 1975.

See also 

 List of American composers

References

Sources 
 Skitch Henderson, Obituaries, Los Angeles Times, November 2, 2005.
 Ol' Blue Eyes and me. Patrice, John, Evening Mail (Birmingham, England), February 2, 2005.
 Skitch Henderson The New York Pops biography
 The Road From Vaudeville to Carnegie Hall
 Associated Press: Skitch Henderson Dies at 87
 Hunt Hill Farm Trust

External links 

 
 

1918 births
2005 deaths
20th-century American composers
20th-century American conductors (music)
20th-century American male musicians
20th-century American pianists
American male composers
American male conductors (music)
American male pianists
American people convicted of tax crimes
American people of Norwegian descent
Capitol Records artists
Classical musicians from Minnesota
Columbia Records artists
People from Norman County, Minnesota
RCA Victor artists
Royal Air Force pilots of World War II
The Tonight Show Band members
United States Army Air Forces pilots of World War II
Military personnel from Minnesota
Arbors Records artists